Edge of Darkness is the 1985 soundtrack by Eric Clapton and Michael Kamen for the British television series Edge of Darkness. The soundtrack's theme won the Ivor Novello Award for songwriting and composing, besides winning the 1986 BAFTA Award for Best Music.

Background and performance
For Clapton, it was his first experience writing for film; shortly after attending Terry Gilliam's movie Brazil with his friend Kamen, who had scored the film, he received a call from the BBC asking him to do the music for Edge of Darkness, and he subsequently asked Kamen for assistance.

In the early 1990s Clapton performed the music live, with the National Philharmonic Orchestra under the direction of Michael Kamen; the title song from one of those performances is captured on 24 Nights.

Reception
The soundtrack attracted few reviews. The Age mentioned the music in a review of the series, saying that Clapton's music matched the mysterious and shadowy feel of the drama; The Atlanta Journal-Constitution, again in a review of the TV series, said the accompanying music was "particularly noteworthy."

The single reached No. 65 on the British charts, on which it spent three weeks in January 1986.

Track listing
"Edge of Darkness" (3:19)
"Shoot Out" (3:48)
"Obituary" (2:09)
"Escape From Northmoor" (3:09)
"Oxford Circus" (3:17)
"Northmoor" (3:02)

Releases
Originally sold as a 45 rpm 12" record and as a cassette, it was re-released in February 1989 as a 3" CD single (with a cover changed from the record's mainly black and red cover). A live version on the main theme was issued on a single together with a live version of "Wonderful Tonight" in 1991, and on the 1991 live album 24 Nights.

References

Eric Clapton soundtracks
1985 live albums
Television soundtracks
1985 EPs
BBC Records soundtracks
Eric Clapton live albums
Live EPs
Eric Clapton EPs